The eastern golden weaver (Ploceus subaureus) is a species of bird in the family Ploceidae.
It is found in eastern and south-eastern Africa. Alternative names used for the eastern golden weaver include yellow weaver, olive-headed golden weaver, and African golden weaver.

References

External links
 Eastern golden weaver -  Species text in Weaver Watch.

eastern golden weaver
Birds of East Africa
eastern golden weaver
Taxonomy articles created by Polbot